Rostislav Kiša (born 24 December 1978) is a Czech football player.

Kiša started his football career at Baník Ostrava and played for this club until the age of 26. He was a member of the squad of Baník Ostrava in the 2003-2004 season, when Baník won the league title.

External links

Czech footballers
1978 births
Living people
Czech First League players
FC Baník Ostrava players
SFC Opava players
FK Jablonec players
Sportspeople from Ostrava
Association football midfielders